Gowd-e Alangu (also Romanized as Gowd-e Ālangū) is a village in Hotkan Rural District, in the Central District of Zarand County, Kerman Province, Iran. At the 2006 census, its population was 24, in 7 families.

References 

Populated places in Zarand County